Irreligion in Africa, encompassing also atheism in Africa as well as agnosticism, secular humanism and general secularism, has been estimated at over tens of millions in various polls. While the predominant religions in Africa are Islam and Christianity, many groups and individuals still practice their traditional beliefs. Despite this the irreligious population is notable, especially in South Africa where 15.1% of the population describe themselves as irreligious and in Botswana, where 20% of the population describes themselves as non-religious.

History
Sources promoting irreligion in Africa have been dated to go back several millennia. Other sources have noted that many African philosophies such as Ubuntu are rooted in a secular humanistic framework. During the 1950s and 1960s, irreligion in Africa became increasingly widespread among the educated classes as communism, socialism and anti-colonial movements gained influence on the continent.

Demographics
The largest self-declared populations of the irreligious in Africa are found in Southern African countries such as South Africa, Mozambique, and Botswana. Irreligion in Ghana has also been the subject of some study.
Irreligious people are also growing in North Africa, where ex-Muslims are more and more vocal, especially in Egypt, Morocco, Tunisia, Libya and Algeria.

Trends
In tandem with the increase of irreligion around the world, the declared population of irreligionists in Africa has been noted to be on the rise.

Notable irreligious people in Africa

Aliaa Magda Elmahdy, Egyptian feminist.
Barack Obama, Sr., Kenyan economist and father of U.S. President Barack Obama.
Chris Hani, South African anti apartheid activist and General Secretary of the South African Communist Party. 
Govan Mbeki, South African anti apartheid activist and father of President of South Africa Thabo Mbeki.
Joe Slovo,  South African anti apartheid activist and General Secretary of the South African Communist Party.
Kareem Amer, Egyptian blogger and political activist.
Kingunge Ngombale–Mwiru, veteran Tanzanian politician.
Leo Igwe, Nigerian human rights activist.
Maikel Nabil Sanad, Egyptian blogger and political activist.
Nadine Gordimer, ANC activist and writer.
Rachid Boudjedra, Algerian writer and novelist.
Ronnie Kasrils, South African anti-apartheid activist.
Samora Machel, socialist leader and President of Mozambique.
Seun Kuti, Nigerian musician.
Tai Solarin, Nigerian writer and educator.
Sherif Gaber Egyptian political activist and blogger.
Wole Soyinka, Nigerian writer and Nobel Prize winner.
Kateb Yacine, Algerian novelist and playwright.
Zackie Achmat, South African anti-apartheid activist.
Zineb El Rhazoui, Moroccan journalist and human rights activist.

References

Further reading
Phil Zuckerman, Atheism and Secularity (2009), p. 75, .